John C. "Fuzzy" Evans (February 13, 1908 – July 22, 1983) was an American football and basketball player and coach.  He served as the head basketball coach at the University of Vermont from 1940 to 1965.  His 23 years at the helm of the Vermont Catamounts men's basketball program makes him the longest tenured basketball coach in school history, while his 260 career wins rank second all-time at Vermont.  Evans was also the head football coach at Vermont from 1940 to 1951.

Playing career
Evans played football and basketball at the University of Illinois at Urbana–Champaign.  His roommate at Illinois was James Reston, later a journalist for The New York Times.  Both men were members of Sigma Pi fraternity.

Coaching career
Evans arrived at Vermont for the 1940–41 season. In his first three years on the job Evans compiled a 29–16 record before the program went on hiatus due to World War II. Two years after the war was over, Vermont basketball enjoyed its best-ever season, winning the first-ever Yankee Conference men's basketball regular season title posting a school-record 19–3 mark, led by future UVM Hall of Famers Larry Killick and Bob Jake. The 19 wins represented the most victories by any Catamount basketball team until 2002.  Killick and Jake were later drafted by the Baltimore Bullets in the 1947 BAA Draft.  While at Vermont, Evans led the Catamounts to eight consecutive Vermont state titles (games between local state colleges and universities), including 30 straight victories at one stretch.

During his tenure, Evans coached future basketball coaches Rollie Massimino ('56) and Herb Brown ('57).   Evans was also a teacher at UVM.  He was inducted to the UVM Athletic Hall of Fame in 1973.

Head coaching record

Football

Basketball

References

1908 births
1983 deaths
American men's basketball coaches
American football halfbacks
Illinois Fighting Illini football players
Illinois Fighting Illini men's basketball players
Vermont Catamounts football coaches
Vermont Catamounts men's basketball coaches
American men's basketball players